Émile Fabre (24 March 1869 in Metz, France – 25 September 1955 in Paris) was a French playwright and general administrator of the Comédie-Française from 1915 to 

1936.:227 He was greatly influenced by Balzac as a young man, and most of his best-known plays deal with the sacrifice of personal happiness to the pursuit of wealth. He also wrote the libretto for Xavier Leroux's opera Les cadeaux de Noël (The Christmas Gifts) which was a great success when it premiered in Paris in 1915.

Career at the Comédie-Française 
Fabre was appointed general administrator of the Comédie-Française on 2 December 1915.:227 According to Susan McCready,During Fabre's tenure, the Comédie-Française moved from the center of the theatre scene, where theatrical creation and innovation are paramount, to its periphery, where [ . . . ] its role was increasingly limited to the preservation of the past.:2In 1922 he organised the Cycle Moliere, in which all of Moliere's plays were performed in chronological order.:231

The success of this event, encouraged him to organise the Centennial of Romanticism in 1927, the 100-year anniversary of Victor Hugo's Preface de Cromwell (Qe Waleffe).:232 Over the course of the Centennial the theatre staged twenty-one Romantic plays.

He resigned from the position 15 October 1936.:227

Plays
Fabre's plays include:
 L'Argent (Money), 1895
 La Vie publique (Public Life), 1901
 Les Ventres dorés (Gilded Stomachs), 1905
 Les Sauterelles (The Locusts), 1911

References

1869 births
1955 deaths
Administrators of the Comédie-Française
19th-century French dramatists and playwrights
20th-century French dramatists and playwrights